Pilviškiai  (Pilveshok) is a village in Vilkaviškis district municipality, in Marijampolė County, central Lithuania.

History
In the Jewish world, it was known historically for its learned population, served amongst others by Rabbi Yechiel Yaakov Weinberg.

In August 1941, the Jewish men of Pilviškiai district were shot. The mass murder was perpetrated by an Einsatzgruppen of Germans and Pilviškiai self-defence police unit. The victims are about 300 to 350 Jewish men and several dozen Soviet activists (including a group of girls from the Communist Youth organization).

Gallery

References

External links
Map, travelingluck.com
listing on jewishgen.org

Towns in Marijampolė County
Towns in Lithuania
Suwałki Governorate
Holocaust locations in Lithuania